Lycos, Inc., is a web search engine and web portal established in 1994, spun out of Carnegie Mellon University. Lycos also encompasses a network of email, web hosting, social networking, and entertainment websites. The company is based in Waltham, Massachusetts, and is a subsidiary of Kakao.

Etymology 
The word "Lycos" is short for "Lycosidae", which is Latin for "wolf spider".

History

Lycos is a university spin-off that began in May 1994 as a research project by Michael Loren Mauldin of Carnegie Mellon University in Pittsburgh. Lycos Inc. was formed with approximately US$2 million in venture capital funding from CMGI. Bob Davis became the CEO and first employee of the new company in 1995, and concentrated on building the company into an advertising-supported web portal, led by Bill Townsend, who served as Vice President, Advertising. Lycos enjoyed several years of growth during the 1990s and became the most visited online destination in the world in 1999, with a global presence in more than 40 countries.

In April 1996, the company completed the fastest initial public offering from inception to offering in NASDAQ (LCOS) history, ending its first day with a market value of $300 million. It also became the first search engine to go public, before its big rivals Yahoo! and Excite. Lycos started offering e-mail services in October 1997, the same year it became one of the first profitable Internet businesses in the world. In 1998, Lycos acquired Tripod.com for $58 million in an attempt to "break into the portal market".

Lycos Europe was a joint venture between Lycos and the Bertelsmann transnational media corporation, but it has always been a distinct corporate entity. Although Lycos Europe remains the largest of Lycos's overseas ventures, several other Lycos subsidiaries also entered into joint venture agreements including Lycos Canada, Lycos Korea and Lycos Asia.

Lycos was one of the most popular websites on the internet, ranking 8th in 1997, and peaking at 4th in both 1999 and 2001.

On May 16, 2000, near the peak of the dot-com bubble, Lycos announced its intent to be acquired by Terra Networks, the Internet arm of the Spanish telecommunications giant Telefónica, for $12.5 billion. The acquisition price represented a return of nearly 3,000 times the company's initial venture capital investment and about 20 times its initial public offering valuation. The transaction closed in October 2000 and the merged company was renamed Terra Lycos, although the Lycos brand continued to be used in the United States. Overseas, the company continued to be known as Terra Networks.

Having been set back by the dot-com bubble burst, Lycos abandoned its own search crawler in late 2001, and started using FAST.

In August 2004, Terra announced that it was selling Lycos to Seoul, South Korea–based Daum Communications Corporation, now Kakao, for $95.4 million in cash, less than 2% of Terra's initial multibillion-dollar investment. In October 2004, the transaction closed and the company name was changed back to Lycos.

Under new ownership, Lycos began to refocus its strategy. The company moved away from being a search-centric portal and toward a community destination for broadband entertainment content. With a new management team in place, Lycos also began divesting properties that were not core to its new strategy. In July 2006, Wired News, which had been part of Lycos since the purchase of Wired Digital in 1998, was sold to Condé Nast Publications and re-merged with Wired Magazine. The Lycos Finance division, best known for Quote.com and RagingBull.com, was sold to FT Interactive Data Corporation in February 2006, while its online dating site, Matchmaker.com, was sold to Date.com. In 2006, Lycos regained ownership of the Lycos trademark from Carnegie Mellon University, allowing the company to rename to Lycos, Inc.

During 2006, Lycos introduced several media services, including Lycos Phone which combined video chat, real-time video on demand, and an MP3 player. In November 2006, Lycos began to roll out applications centered on social media, including its video application, Lycos Cinema, that featured simultaneous watch and chat functionality. In February 2007, Lycos MIX was launched, allowing users to pull video clips from YouTube, Google Video, Yahoo! Video and MySpace Video. Lycos MIX also allowed users to create playlists where other users could add video comments and chat in real-time.

As part of a corporate restructuring to focus on mobile, social networks and location-based services, Daum sold Lycos for $36 million in August 2010 to Ybrant Digital, an Internet marketing company based in Hyderabad, India. Ybrant Digital paid $20 million at signing and there has been a legal dispute over magnitude of the second installment between Ybrant and Daum. In 2018, a New York court ruled in favor of Daum and appointed Daum (by then merged with Kakao) as receiver of Ybrant's 56% ownership interest in Lycos.

In May 2012, Lycos announced the appointment of former employee Rob Balazy as CEO of Media division of Lycos.

In September 2014, Ed Noel was appointed in place of Rob and manages the operations under the title of General Manager of Lycos Media.

In June 2015, Lycos announced a pair of wearable devices, called Band and Ring.

Lycos Internet was renamed Brightcom Group in May 2018.

Lycos Network sites
 Angelfire, a Lycos property which provides paid web hosting, blogging and web publishing tools
 Tripod, a Lycos property providing paid web hosting, blogging and web publishing tools

Lycos-branded sites
 Lycos Chat, a photo chatting community.
 Lycos Domains, Internet domain name purchasing
 Lycos Mail, an e-mail provider formerly known as Mailcity.com. (As of 15 May 2018 providing only paid services.)
 Lycos Weather
 Lycos Yellow Pages

Former Lycos sites
 Chickmail, a free e-mail service sponsored by ChickClick
 Chickpages, a free web hosting service sponsored by ChickClick
 Estromail, a free e-mail service sponsored by Estronet
 Estropages, a free web hosting service sponsored by Estronet
 Gamesville, Lycos multi-player gaming site
 GetRelevant.com, a Lycos online advertising site
 Gurlmail, a free e-mail service sponsored by Delia's for Gurl.com
 Gurlpages, a free web hosting service sponsored by Delia's for Gurl.com
 Hotbot, a search engine
 InsiderInfo
 Lycos Radio, allowed users to create and host their own free Internet radio shows
 Matchmaker.com, a dating site
 Quote.com and RagingBull.com, finance sites
 Weather Zombie, a Lycos property which provided weather forecasts, with a zombie theme, via AccuWeather
 Webmonkey, web-building help and tutorials
 WhoWhere.com, a people search engine
 Wired.com, the online arm of Wired magazine

References

External links
 

1994 establishments in Pennsylvania
1996 initial public offerings
2000 mergers and acquisitions
2004 mergers and acquisitions
Carnegie Mellon University software
Companies based in Waltham, Massachusetts
Dot-com bubble
Online mass media companies of the United States
Internet properties established in 1994
Internet search engines
Technology companies based in the Boston area
American companies established in 1994
University spin-offs
Web portals
Webmail
Kakao
Web 1.0